Thekke Madhom (Malayalam: തെക്കേമഠം) is one of the four ancient South Indian madhoms that propagate Adwaita or Non dualism. It is located at Thrissur City in Kerala. Padmapadacharya was the first acharya of Thekke Madhom.

References 

Madhoms in Thrissur
Festivals in Thrissur district
Culture of Thrissur
Hindu pilgrimage sites in India
Religious organisations based in India